Vannara Be (born 16 February 1988) is a Cambodian born Australian male weightlifter, competing in the 62 kg category and representing Australia at international competitions. He participated at the 2010 Commonwealth Games in the 62 kg event. at the 2014 Commonwealth Games in the 62 kg event.

Personal
Her younger sister Socheata  Be is also an international weightlifter who competed at the 2014 Commonwealth Games. They settled in Australia around 1998, joining their father Vanthy, who had been sponsored for a work visa by a Yarra Valley vineyard. Their uncle Vantho travelled by boat to Australia as a refugee more than a decade earlier, eventually encouraging their father to make the journey and later his wife Chantha and children. Their father's brother and a sister were killed on the killing fields of their homeland, the latter's death causing so much anguish to Vannara and Socheata's grandmother that she lost the use of one eye.

Major competitions

References

External links
 
 
 
 
 

1988 births
Living people
Australian male weightlifters
Weightlifters at the 2010 Commonwealth Games
Commonwealth Games competitors for Australia
Place of birth missing (living people)
Weightlifters at the 2014 Commonwealth Games
Weightlifters at the 2018 Commonwealth Games
Cambodian emigrants to Australia